This is a list of the first women lawyer(s) and judge(s) in Alaska. It includes the year in which the women were admitted to practice law (in parentheses). Also included are women who achieved other distinctions such becoming the first in their state to graduate from law school or become a political figure.

Firsts in Alaska's history

Lawyers 

First female: Nathalena "Natalie" Roberts Moore (1908) 
First African American female: Mahala Ashley Dickerson (1959)

State judges 

 First (Inupiaq) female magistrate: Sadie Neakok in 1960
 First Alaska Native female (district court): Nora Guinn in 1967 
 First females: Dorothy Tyner and Mary Alice Miller in 1968 
 First female (Superior Court of Alaska): Beverly Cutler in 1982 
 First female (Alaska Supreme Court/Chief Justice): Dana Fabe (1976) beginning in 1996 
 First African American female: Pamela Scott Washington (1991) in 2010
First Asian American female: Jo-Ann Chung in 2011 
First female (Alaska Court of Appeals): Marjorie Allard (1999) in 2012

Federal judges 
 First female (U.S. District Court for the District of Alaska): Sharon L. Gleason (1984) in 2012 
 First female (U.S. Court of Appeals for the Ninth Circuit): Morgan Christen (1986) in 2012

Attorney General of Alaska 

First female: Grace Berg Schaible (1959) from 1987-1989

United States Attorney 

 First female: Karen L. Loeffler from 2009-2017

District Attorney 

 First female: Catherine Stevens (née Bittner Chandler) circa 1960s-1970s

Alaska Bar Association 

 First female admitted: Dorothy Awes Haaland (1945) 
 First female (president): Donna Willard-Jones from 1979-1980

Firsts in local history 
Dorothy Tyner: First female lawyer in Anchorage, Alaska [Municipality of Anchorage, Alaska]
Mahala Ashley Dickerson (1959): First African American female lawyer in Anchorage, Alaska [Municipality of Anchorage, Alaska] 
Mary Anne Henry: First female prosecutor in the Anchorage District Attorney's Office (c. 1970s)
Karen Hunt (1973): First female appointed as a Judge of the Superior Court of Anchorage (1983) [Municipality of Anchorage, Alaska]

 Aline Chenot Baskerville Bradley Beegler (1920): First female lawyer in Fairbanks, Alaska

 Mildred Hermann (1934): First female lawyer in Juneau, Alaska [City and Borough of Juneau, Alaska]
Angie Kemp: First female District Attorney for the City and Borough of Juneau, Alaska

 Beverly Cutler: First female judge of the Superior Court of Palmer (1982) [Matanuska-Susitna Borough, Alaska]

 Sadie Neakok: First female magistrate in Utqiagvik (Barrow), Alaska (1960)

 Nora Guinn: First Alaska Native female (non-attorney) to serve as a magistrate of Bethel, Alaska (1959)

See also  

 List of first women lawyers and judges in the United States
 Timeline of women lawyers in the United States
 Women in law

Other topics of interest 

 List of first minority male lawyers and judges in the United States
 List of first minority male lawyers and judges in Alaska

References 

Lawyers, Alaska, first
Alaska, first
Alaska, first
Women, Alaska, first
Women, Alaska, first
Women in Alaska
Lawyers and judges
Alaska lawyers